was one of the chief allies of Minamoto no Yoshitomo in the Heiji Rebellion of 1159. As a member of the Fujiwara clan, Nobuyori might have been in line to become regent, and he desired power, which he obtained for a short while following the Rebellion.

Fujiwara no Nobuyori was known for being a male attendant for sexual purposes of Emperor Go-Shirakawa, who later placed him on a high government post.

In the late 1150s, a dispute arose between the followers of the reigning Emperor Nijō and those who favored the retired (cloistered) Emperor Go-Shirakawa. Though Fujiwara no Michinori and the Taira clan supported Nijō, Nobuyori and his Minamoto allies supported Go-Shirakawa's bid to retain some influence and power.

When Taira no Kiyomori, head of his clan, left Kyoto for a time in 1159, it seemed the perfect opportunity for Nobuyori and the Minamoto to make a move; though some say Kiyomori left the city intentionally, luring his enemies into a trap. Nobuyori and the Minamoto attacked the Sanjō Palace, abducting the former Emperor Go-Shirakawa, killing much of his staff, and setting the building aflame. They brought him to the Great Palace, where Emperor Nijō was being held hostage as well. They then moved on to the home of chief-councillor Fujiwara no Michinori, killing everyone there; Michinori escaped, only to be captured and decapitated soon afterwards. Nobuyori then had Nijō appoint him Chancellor, under duress. Though he still had enemies at Court who encouraged the emperor to resist and to escape, overall Nobuyori's plan had succeeded.

This did not last for long, however, since Taira no Kiyomori returned, and the Minamoto were not sufficiently prepared to defend the city against him. The emperor and ex-emperor both were freed, the Minamoto defeated, and Nobuyori killed in February 1160.

Near the end of the rebellion, Fujiwara no Nobuyuri was beheaded.

References

Further reading
Sansom, George (1958). A History of Japan to 1334. Stanford, California: Stanford University Press.

Fujiwara clan
1160 deaths
People of Heian-period Japan
Year of birth unknown
Male_lovers_of_royalty
Japanese LGBT people